A list of feature films produced or filmed in the territory of modern-day North Macedonia.

Ottoman Empire

1900s

1910s

Kingdom of Yugoslavia

1920s

1940s

SFR Yugoslavia

1950s

1960s

1970s

1980s

1990s

Republic of Macedonia

1990s

2000s

2010s

Republic of North Macedonia

2010s

2020s

Macedonian co-produced

1990s

2000s

2010s

2020s

References

External links
 Macedonian film at the Internet Movie Database
 North Macedonia Film Agency

North Macedonia

Films